Synaphea favosa is a shrub endemic to Western Australia.

It usually blooms between September and November producing yellow flowers.

It is found along the south coast in the South West, Great Southern and Goldfields-Esperance regions of Western Australia where it grows in sandy soils sometimes over granite or sandstone.

References

Eudicots of Western Australia
favosa
Endemic flora of Western Australia
Plants described in 1810